The XIV Reserve Corps was a corps level command of the German Army in World War I.

Formation 
XIV Reserve Corps was formed on the outbreak of the war in August 1914 as part of the mobilisation of the Army.  It was initially commanded by General der Artillerie Richard von Schubert, brought out of retirement.  It was still in existence at the end of the war in the 17th Army, Heeresgruppe Kronprinz Rupprecht on the Western Front.

Structure on formation 
On formation in August 1914, XIV Reserve Corps consisted of two divisions, made up of reserve units.  In general, Reserve Corps and Reserve Divisions were weaker than their active counterparts
Reserve Infantry Regiments did not always have three battalions nor necessarily contain a machine gun company
Reserve Jäger Battalions did not have a machine gun company on formation
Reserve Cavalry Regiments consisted of just three squadrons
Reserve Field Artillery Regiments usually consisted of two abteilungen of three batteries each.
Corps Troops generally consisted of a Telephone Detachment and four sections of munition columns and trains 

In summary, XIV Reserve Corps mobilised with 26 infantry battalions, 7 machine gun companies (42 machine guns), 6 cavalry squadrons, 12 field artillery batteries (72 guns) and 3 pioneer companies.  26th Reserve Division was formed by units drawn from the XIII Corps District (Württemberg).  It included one active Infantry Regiment (180th).

Combat chronicle 
On mobilisation, XIV Reserve Corps was assigned to the 7th Army forming part of the right wing of the forces for the Schlieffen Plan offensive in August 1914.

Commanders 
XIV Reserve Corps had the following commanders during its existence:

See also 

 German Army order of battle (1914)
 German Army order of battle, Western Front (1918)

References

Bibliography

Further reading

 

Corps of Germany in World War I
Military units and formations established in 1914
Military units and formations disestablished in 1918